Ogib is a rural locality (a village) in Lentyevskoye Rural Settlement, Ustyuzhensky District, Vologda Oblast, Russia. The population was 53 as of 2002.

Geography 
Gromoshikha is the nearest rural locality.

References 

Rural localities in Ustyuzhensky District